This is a list of large carnivores known to prey on humans. 

A Carnivoran is a mammal that specializes in eating flesh. This list does not include animal attacks on humans by domesticated species (dogs), or animals held in zoos, aquaria, circuses, private homes or other non-natural settings. Prey is defined as "to be hunted and killed by" or "to be vulnerable to or overcome by." An idiomatic (rather than ecological) definition is preferred here because although, statistically, attacks on humans by wild carnivores are an extremely rare cause of death—even in regions with high levels of human-wildlife interaction and relatively high absolute numbers of attacks—the topic remains one of great fascination to contemporary humans unused to or uncomfortable with being vulnerable to the larger food web. 

Documented carnivore attacks on humans do appear to be increasing in frequency for a constellation of reasons including human population growth, animal habitat loss, and declining populations of traditional prey species.

See also
 List of largest land carnivorans
 List of deadliest animals to humans
 Largest wild canids
 List of largest cats

Notes

References

External links
 How to Survive a Cheetah Attack

Mammals and humans
Lists of animals